is a Japanese football player. He plays for Giravanz Kitakyushu.

Club statistics
Updated to 10 December 2017.

References

External links
Profile at JEF United Chiba

1996 births
Living people
Association football people from Gunma Prefecture
Japanese footballers
J2 League players
J3 League players
JEF United Chiba players
J.League U-22 Selection players
Mito HollyHock players
Giravanz Kitakyushu players
Association football defenders